Branscombe is a village in the English county of Devon; it may also refer to:

Branscombe Richmond (born 1955), American actor
Alan Branscombe (1936–1986), English jazz musician
Gena Branscombe (1881–1977), Canadian composer
Peter Branscombe (1929–2008), English musicologist
Walter Branscombe (c. 1220–1280), bishop of Exeter

See also

Branscomb (disambiguation)